Zachary Mooradian Furness is an American cultural studies scholar, punk musician and author.

Biography
Born in 1977 in Pittsburgh, Furness earned a bachelor's degree in English from Pennsylvania State University, a master's degree and doctorate in Communication studies from the University of Pittsburgh, as well as a doctoral certificate in Women's Studies. He is currently associate professor of communications at Penn State Greater Allegheny where he also serves as Communications Program Coordinator and the WMKP Radio General Manager. Prior to working at Penn State, Furness taught in the Cultural Studies program at Columbia College Chicago and in the Speech Communication department at Shoreline Community College. He is an interdisciplinary researcher and possibly best known for his book One Less Car: Bicycling and the Politics of Automobility. In addition to his work on cycling advocacy and bicycle culture, Furness is the editor of Punkademics, the co-editor (with Thomas Oates) of The NFL: Critical and Cultural Perspectives, and he has written for a variety of edited volumes, zines, and magazines, including Punk Planet, Bitch (magazine), and Souciant. From 2003 to 2013 he was an editor with the pioneering internet publication Bad Subjects and a semi-regular contributor.

He is the son of former NFL player and coach, Steve Furness, and played in punk bands for over twenty years.

Selected works

Books 
One Less Car: Bicycling and the Politics of Automobility (Philadelphia: Temple University Press, 2010).
Editor, Punkademics (Brooklyn, NY: Minor Compositions / Autonomedia, 2012).
Editor with Thomas Oates, The NFL: Critical and Cultural Perspectives (Philadelphia: Temple University Press, 2014)

Journal articles 
Reframing Concussions, Masculinity, and NFL Mythology in League of Denial, Popular Communication, Vol. 14, No. 1 (2016): 49–57.
Critical Mass, Urban Space and Vélomobility, Mobilities, Vol. 2, No. 2 (2007): 299–319.
Biketivism and Technology: Historical Reflections and Appropriations, Social Epistemology, Vol. 19, No. 4 (2005): 401–417.

Zines and magazines 
"The Wu-Tang Clan’s Failed Experiment," Souciant, Dec 16, 2015.
"Museums From Below," Souciant, June 24, 2015.
"Walking Wounded: Author Carrie A. Rentschler Reframes the Discourse of Victimization," Bitch Magazine, No. 52 (2011), p. 19-21.
"It’s Alright to Cry (and Needlepoint): Rosey Grier, Football Hero and Unlikely Craft God," Bitch Magazine, No. 49 (Winter, 2010), pp. 17–18, 21.
"The Obama Administration and the Rule of 'Opposite Day'," Bad Subjects #80: Obama Annus Unus (2009).
"Utopia and the City: An Interview with David Pinder," Bad Subjects #78: Hope (2007).
"Federico Gomez: Pioneer of the Hardcore/Punk Scene in Israel," Punk Planet #80, July/Aug 2007, pp. 40–43.

References

External links 
Brief discussion of One Less Car in Maria Konnikova, "Cars vs. Bikes vs. Pedestrians," The New Yorker 5 Nov 2015..
Review of The NFL: Critical and Cultural Perspectives in Sport in American Society, 25 June 2015.
Review of Punkademics in The Los Angeles Review of Books, 21 Jan 2013.
Brief discussion of One Less Car in The Los Angeles Review of Books, 4 Sept 2013.
One Less Car selected as Top 10 book of 2012 in urban planning by Planetizen.

1977 births
Living people
Pennsylvania State University alumni
University of Pittsburgh alumni
Pennsylvania State University faculty
Cycling advocates